HMS Namur was a 90-gun second-rate ship of the line of the Royal Navy, built at Chatham Dockyard to the draught specified by the 1745 Establishment as amended in 1750, and launched on 3 March 1756. HMS Namur’s battle honours surpass even those of the more famous HMS Victory.

History 

Namur was the flagship of Vice-Admiral Edward Boscawen in the capture of Louisburg in 1758. General James Wolfe had sailed across the Atlantic in Namur on this occasion before his capture of Quebec. Also on this journey was 6th Lieutenant Michael Henry Pascal, with his slave and servant Olaudah Equiano (called Gustavus Vasser at the time - this was the slave name given him by Pascal). In his book, Equiano wrote that the ceremony of surrender was "the most beautiful procession on the water I ever saw", and gives more detail of the occasion.
In 1758, fifteen Namur sailors were tried and condemned to death by hanging for mutiny; they had protested to be replaced aboard another ship. The King's grace reprieved them from death penalty, except for one sailor.

Namur was the flagship of Admiral Sir George Pocock in the Battle of Havana (1762).

Namur fought in the Battle of Cape St Vincent (1797) under the command of Captain James Hawkins-Whitshed.

Namur was razeed to a 74-gun ship in 1805, and took part in the naval engagement of 4 November 1805 (the Battle of Cape Ortegal), when the remnants of the French and Spanish fleet which had escaped from Trafalgar was engaged by Lord Strachan's squadron; she took on and captured the French warship Formidable. She was placed on harbour service in 1807 and remained in this role until 1833, when she was finally broken up.

Some of Namur 's timbers were used to support the floor of the wheelwright's workshop at Chatham Dockyard. They were rediscovered there in 1995 and identified in 2003.. The timbers represent approximately a quarter of the Namur 's frame and are from a contiguous section of the ship's orlop deck and adjacent hull frames. While deck beams were repurposed to form and support the floor of the wheelright's shop, many others were placed in the gaps between these beams and serve no structural purpose, including many of the ship's futtock and knee timbers. Evidence suggests that the timbers were removed sequentially from the Namur as the ship was dismantled and directly installed under the workshop. While repurposing of ship timbers for structural purposes ashore was very common, the rediscovered timbers of the Namur are rare in being entirely unmodified, still bearing original carpenter's marks, traces of red paint common to Royal Navy warship lower deck interiors of the period, numbers denoting sailor's hammock berths, hammock hooks and lengths of oakum. The presence of many superfluous lengths of timber in and under the new workshop floor and their unaltered condition has been suggested as a deliberate form of preservation by workers at the Dockyard at the time, in recognition of the fame of the Namur and its prestigious service record. It is possible that the preservation and hiding of as much fabric as possible from the Namur was officially sanctioned by the Captain Superintendent of Chatham Dockyard, James Alexander Gordon, who had served on the ship during the Battle of Cape St. Vincent in 1797. The restored timbers form the centerpiece of the "Command of the Oceans" gallery at the Chatham Historic Dockyard museum opened in 2016.

Notable crewmembers
 The marine painter Clarkson Stanfield served on board the ship, after being pressed into the Royal Navy in 1808. He was discharged on health grounds in 1814.
 One of Namur'''s captains was Charles Austen, a brother of Jane Austen.
 Olaudah Equiano, a former African slave who was active in the British abolitionist movement, served as a powder monkey on Namur.

Notes

Further reading
 Chapter III and Chapter IV of The Interesting Narrative of the Life of Olaudah Equiano, or Gustavus Vassa, the African'', at Wikisource, contain an account of the author's service aboard HMS Namur.

External links
 

Ships of the line of the Royal Navy
1756 ships